Mario Kienzl (born 19 December 1983 in Feldkirch) is an Austrian professional footballer. He last played for FC Vaduz in Liechtenstein.

External links
 

1983 births
Living people
Austrian footballers
Austria international footballers
Austrian expatriate footballers
SK Sturm Graz players
FC Vaduz players
Austrian expatriate sportspeople in Liechtenstein
Austrian Football Bundesliga players
Swiss Challenge League players
Expatriate footballers in Liechtenstein
Association football midfielders
People from Feldkirch, Vorarlberg
Footballers from Vorarlberg